was a Japanese model and actress who, set to debut as an idol singer, committed suicide at age 17. She is not to be confused with narrator Yasuko Endō (遠藤泰子) or later actress Yasuko Endō (遠藤靖子).

Biography
Endō was born in Kōtō-ku, Tokyo, and was a student at Aoyama Public High School night classes.  In her fifth year of elementary school, she joined the Himawari Theatre Group but left due to poor grades. In her second year of junior high school she was scouted by Box Corporation. At that same office was pre-debut Miho Nakayama and they became friends. Endō began professional activities in 1983. She modeled in magazines including Hana to Yume, Olive, GORO, Deluxe Jump, Lemon Pie Momoco, Beppin, Suppin, Heibon Punch, Penthouse Japan, THE Shashin, Deluxe Magazine,mc Sister, and The Sugar and appeared in commercials for Kentucky Fried Chicken, Sapporo Ichiban, and Nagatanien.

Afterwards, she switched to Hirata Office, and in 1985 made her acting debut in the TV drama Okusama wa Fuyou Shoujo!? Osanadzuma. In that same year's broadcast of the first Sukeban Deka starring Yuki Saito as Saki Asamiya, Endō gained attention for her role as Ayumi Mizuchi.

Suicide
Although she had been scheduled to debut as an idol singer on May 21, 1986 with Riv.Star Records song "In the Distance" (composed by Tetsuo Sakurai with arrangement by Yūji Toriyama and lyrics by Masako Arikawa), earlier that same year on March 30, she jumped from the roof of a seven floor building in Asakusabashi, Taito-ku and killed herself. On that day at 5:40 PM, Endō went with Hirata Office manager to the cafe her mother ran, where the three had a meeting to prepare for her singing debut. The discussion ended at 7:10, after talking to her mother about 20 minutes she left the shop with the words "I'm sorry Mama"(ママごめんね). After that, she proceeded to enter the building next to the cafe, left an earring on the rooftop, and jumped. At 8:34, she was found collapsed in the road by passersby and taken to a hospital in Sumida-ku, where death was confirmed at 9:30 PM, aged 17.

Although it has been said that her office was opposed to the continuation of her relationship with her lover, her mother and associates of Hirata Office deny this. According to her mother, she had been acting strangely for about a month before her death, and until that time had been reading things like Shūsaku Endō's essay Ai to Jinsei wo Meguru Dansō, suddenly she started reading hard-boiled novels such as The Beast to Die, Senshi no Banka, and Kako (Remember), Endō herself also began frequently saying the word "death", and the pressure of very busy work with no break may have led to exhaustion. Also, Endō was said to have been preoccupied with the lyrics of the B-side track to her scheduled debut single, "Telephone". Producer Yukio Hashi commented: "I pepped her up saying 'Surpass Miho Nakayama', she cheerfully and brightly replied 'Yes'. She was the kind of girl who said things directly and even though she said so clearly 'I'll definitely do it for sure'...I still don't believe it even now."

Shortly after Endō's death, idol Yukiko Okada also jumped from the roof of the Sun Music building. Endō is considered to have been the inspiration for Okada's suicide, and the term Okada and Yukko syndrome entered the vernacular.

Tributes
In 1988, two years after her death, Miho Nakayama, who was a close friend from her modeling days, performed a song called "Long Distance Tengoku e" during a concert tour. As an homage to the title of Endō's cancelled debut single "In the Distance", it was held as a requiem for her. Nakayama wrote the lyrics and composed the song herself. The song title changed to "Long Distance to the Heaven", and it was included on her album Mind Game, released in July of that year. Nakayama touched about this song in essay collection P.S. I LOVE YOU released 1991. Also in the 2009 collection "Nazenara Yasashii Machi ga Atta Kara", Endō is written about with name excluded.

Roles

TV
 '85nen Gata Kazoku Awase（1985, TBS）as Sachiko Kubota
 Sukeban Deka as Ayumi Mizuchi
  Getsuyou Drama Land Osanadzuma Okusama wa Furyou Shoujo!? Osanadzuma（1985, CX）

Movie
 Mashō no Natsu Yotsuya Kaidan（1981）

Commercials
 Hitachi Hitachi Dryer
 Sanyō Shokuhin Sapporo Ichiban
 NEC PC
 Shiseido Hair Cologne
 Kao Corporation Essential Shampoo
 Kentucky Fried Chicken
 Nagatanien sakezushi – with Saburō Kitajima
 Toshimaen summer pool poster

External links

 Yasuko Endō at Oricon
 Yasuko Endō at Mairi.me

References

Japanese idols
1968 births
1986 deaths
People of Shōwa-period Japan
20th-century Japanese actresses
1986 suicides
Suicides by jumping in Japan